

Galactic Hacker Party (1989)
The Galactic Hacker Party was a hacker con that was held in Paradiso in the Netherlands from August 2, 1989 to August 4, 1989 Visitors were people with an interest in technology (mainly computers) and the - at that time - relatively unknown internet.

Hacker party and conference

Along with the party, a conference was held, named ICATA (Intercontinental conference on alternative use of technology Amsterdam), but both organisers and visitors saw the combination actually as one event. This combination proved to be successful and the concept has been repeated every four years since, up to Still Hacking Anyway in 2017.

Organisation and attendance
Driving force behind the event were people associated with the hacker magazine Hack-Tic, its editor in chief Rop Gonggrijp, Patrice Riemens, and Caroline Nevejan on behalf of Paradiso. It was supported by a department of the University of Amsterdam, which supplied a permanent connection to the internet, a novelty at the time.

The Galactic Hacker Party and conference were attended by Hack-Tic readers and contributors, people from the German Chaos Computer Club, the New York based 2600: The Hacker Quarterly, along with participants from various other countries. Attendees exchanged knowledge and experience on computer systems, dial-up connections, computer viruses and hacking, which wasn't yet illegal. At the conference lectures were held on feminism and computers, models for artificial intelligence and on computer-human interaction. The joint declaration of the conference started with "The free and infuttered flow of information is an essential part of our fundamental liberties and shall be upheld in all circumstances."

Hacking at the End of the Universe (1993)

Hacking in Progress (1997) 
HIP'97 took place from August 8 until August 10, 1997 at the campsite Kotterbos in Almere, Netherlands.

Hackers at Large (2001) 

HAL2001 was a Dutch hacker con held at the University of Twente, Enschede, Netherlands between August 10 to August 12, 2001. This site, which hosts one of Europe's major network operations centers, was unique in allowing the conference to have, at the time, the largest Internet uplink speeds of any conference: a fiber-optic connection in excess of 1 gigabit per second. The conference never fully utilized the bandwidth; maximum bandwidth use was approximately 200 Mbit/s.

The main political topic of the conference was the fight against the DMCA and similar anti-hacker legislation under way in Europe.

The name HAL was primarily derived from the film 2001: A Space Odyssey, in which HAL is the name of the ship's artificial intelligence. This name was backronymed Hackers At Large.

The conference was held primarily outdoors. Logistically speaking, the network structure was quite a feat, with approximately 15 km of category 5 cable for the ethernet backbones, as well as supplying power feeds for the tents' computers.

There was a technology-free zone, The Solaris Sl@ckers S@lon, named for the 1972 film by Andrei Tarkovsky, which is often thought to be the Russian answer to 2001: A Space Odyssey. The only technology permitted in the place was a television, a DVD player running the movie, and a Turkish (electric) samovar for brewing tea. A fishtank was set aside for drowning mobile phones which rang in the tent (it remained empty).

This conference was run by Stichting HAL2001, a not-for-profit organization. Attendance was 2900.

What the Hack (2005)

Hacking at Random (2009)

Observe. Hack. Make. (2013)

Still Hacking Anyway (2017)

May Contain Hackers (2022)

References

Hacker conventions